Tridha Choudhury is an Indian actress who predominantly appears in Hindi series and films and Telugu films. She won the title, Clean & Clear Times of India Freshface 2011. Her first movie was Mishawr Rawhoshyo in 2013, directed by Srijit Mukherji. She made her television debut in the Star Plus series Dahleez which was premiered on 14 March 2016. Her latest work being Bandish Bandits directed by Anand Tewari & Aashram by Prakash Jha.

In 2020, she appeared on the Amazon Prime Video web series Bandish Bandits and the MX Player original web series Aashram.

Early life and education
Choudhury was born in Kolkata, West Bengal, She studied in M. P. Birla Foundation Higher Secondary School and attended Scottish Church College in Kolkata.

Media 
Choudhury was ranked in The Times Of India's "Most Desirable Women List" at No. 13 in 2020.

Filmography

Films

Short films

Television

Web series

Music videos

References

External links
 

Living people
Indian television actresses
Indian film actresses
Actresses in Hindi cinema
21st-century Indian actresses
Scottish Church College alumni
University of Calcutta alumni
Actresses from Kolkata
Actresses in Hindi television
Actresses in Bengali cinema
Actresses in Telugu cinema
Year of birth missing (living people)